Eric Grimes Weems (born July 4, 1985) is a former American football wide receiver, special teamer, and return specialist. He played college football at Bethune–Cookman and was signed by the Atlanta Falcons as an undrafted free agent in 2007. He has also played for the Chicago Bears and Tennessee Titans.

Early years
Weems attended Seabreeze High School in Daytona Beach, Florida and was a letterman in football and basketball. In football, as a senior, he was named the team M.V.P. and was an All-Area selection and an All-State selection. In basketball, he was an All-Area selection.

College career
While attending Bethune-Cookman University in his hometown of Daytona Beach, Florida, Weems was a stand-out wide receiver/A-back for the Bethune–Cookman Wildcats football team. He played under head coach Alvin Wyatt from 2003 to 2007. Weems left with his name in the records for numerous receiving categories throughout his four-year career at Bethune-Cookman. In his senior year, he added special teams to his portfolio, serving as the kickoff and punt return specialist for the Wildcats.

Professional career

Atlanta Falcons

2007 season
Weems saw action in the NFL for the first time in the season finale against the Seattle Seahawks. He did not post any statistics.

2008 season
Weems's first career reception came with a 4-yard catch in the first quarter of the Falcons' week 12 match-up against the Carolina Panthers. Later in the same game, Weems provided a key block for a 7-yard Harry Douglas touchdown run. His first career fumble recovery came on a Minnesota Vikings muffed punt in week 16 of the 2008 season.

2009 season

Weems won a job with the Atlanta Falcons as a punt returner in 2009 when wide receiver Harry Douglas was placed on the injured reserved list with a season ending knee injury. Weems ended up returning both punts and kicks as the season progressed.
Weems scored his first career touchdown against the Dallas Cowboys in Week 7 of the 2009 season, he caught a 30-yard touchdown pass from quarterback Matt Ryan. Weems scored his second career touchdown against the New York Giants in Week 11 of the 2009 season, he had a 4-yard touchdown reception.

On the night of November 16, 2009, Weems was arrested in DeKalb County, Georgia for suspicion of driving under the influence of alcohol. Shortly afterward, Weems released a statement saying “Unfortunately, I was involved in an incident on November 17, 2009. I am embarrassed about the situation and I sincerely apologize to the entire Atlanta Falcons organization and our great fans.” No specific action was taken by the Atlanta Falcons or the NFL.

Weems finished the 2009 season with 6 catches for 50 yards and 2 touchdowns. He also rushed 8 times for 53 yards. Weems returned 48 kicks for 1214 yards and 27 punts for 270 yards, fumbled 3 times losing 2 of them, and recorded 10 tackles.

2010 season
Weems had a career-high of four catches against the Pittsburgh Steelers in the first week of the 2010 season. He had his first career start as a wide receiver against the Arizona Cardinals in week 2. Weems returned his first career kickoff return for a touchdown against the Tampa Bay Buccaneers on week 13 of the season. The 102 yards was a franchise record for the Atlanta Falcons. He also returned his first career punt return for a touchdown against the Carolina Panthers on week 17 of the season. The 55 yards was a career-high. Weems was selected to the 2011 Pro Bowl as a special teams member. Weems Finished the 2010 season with 6 catches for 61 yards. He returned 40 kickoffs for a 1,100 yards with one touchdown. Weems returned 18 punts for 230 yards with one touchdown. Weems also recorded 16 tackles on special teams. He was the only player in the NFC to return a kick and a punt for a touchdown.

Weems had a notable contribution for the Atlanta Falcons in the 2010-2011 NFC divisional championship game against the Green Bay Packers. Early in the second quarter, Weems fielded a kickoff two yards deep in his team's own end zone and ran virtually untouched for 102-yard kickoff return touchdown. The 102-yard return was the longest play in NFL postseason history.

2011 season
The Atlanta Falcons re-signed Weems to a one-year contract on July 31, 2011. He appeared in all 16 games with the Atlanta Falcons, He made 2 starts at the wide receiver position. Weems caught a career-high 11 catches for a career-high 90 yards. Weems returned 24 kicks for 563 yards. He also returned 32 punts for 315 Yards. Weems also recorded 12 tackles on special teams. He did not score any touchdowns.

Weems was selected as a first-team alternate for the 2012 Pro bowl as a special teams player.

Weems returned four kickoffs for an average of 20 yards per kickoff and a long of 27 yards in the NFC Wild Card Round game between the Atlanta Falcons and New York Giants. He did not record any receptions in the 24–2 loss.

Chicago Bears

On March 14, 2012, Weems signed a three-year contract with the Chicago Bears as an unrestricted free agent. Weems played in all 16 games with one start at the wide receiver position. Weems caught 2 balls for only 27 yards. He returned 13 kickoffs for 231 yards and 1 punt for no yards. Weems fumbled once and recovered 2 fumbles during the season. He also made 8 tackles. The Bears  finished the season with a record of 10-6 and did not make the playoffs.

Weems appeared in all 16 games with the Bears in 2013. He recorded only one reception for eight yards. Weems returned five kickoffs for 57 yards. Weems recorded nine tackles in the season and forced one fumble.

After the Bears signed Santonio Holmes, Weems was released by the team on August 16, 2014.

Atlanta Falcons (second stint)
On August 21, 2014, Weems signed with the Atlanta Falcons. Weems appeared in all 16 regular season games with the Atlanta Falcons in 2014. On October 5, Weems forced a fumble and recovered a fumble on separate occasions against the New York Giants. He caught his first touchdown of the season against the Green Bay Packers on December 8. He then caught his second touchdown two weeks later on December 21, against the New Orleans Saints. Weems caught 10 passes for a career-high 102 yards and two touchdowns. On special teams, he recorded thirteen tackles, two fumble recoveries, a forced fumble, and returned two kicks for 34 yards.

Weems signed a two-year extension with the Falcons on March 6, 2015. Weems saw action in all 16 games. He had one reception for 11 yards. Weems returned 15 kicks for 403 yards. He also returned 19 punts for 221 yards.

In the 2016 season, Weems would be part of a record-breaking Falcons team. On September 18, 2016, he returned a punt for a career-long 73 yards against the Oakland Raiders. Weems and the Falcons reached Super Bowl LI, where they faced the New England Patriots. In the Super Bowl, Weems had two kick returns for 25 total yards and one punt return for no yards. the Falcons fell in a 34–28 overtime defeat.

Tennessee Titans

On March 10, 2017, Weems signed with the Tennessee Titans. He was released on September 2, 2017, but was re-signed the next day.

On March 9, 2018, Weems was released by the Titans.

NFL career statistics

References

External links

ESPN profile
Atlanta Falcons bio
Twitter account

1985 births
Living people
American football return specialists
American football wide receivers
Atlanta Falcons players
Bethune–Cookman Wildcats football players
Chicago Bears players
Players of American football from Florida
Seabreeze High School alumni
Sportspeople from Daytona Beach, Florida
Tennessee Titans players